Mount Nyiragongo is an active stratovolcano with an elevation of  in the Virunga Mountains associated with the Albertine Rift.

Nyiragongo's lava lake has at times been the most voluminous known lava lake in recent history. The depth of the lava lake varies considerably. The level has gradually risen since then. Nyiragongo and nearby Nyamuragira are together responsible for 40 per cent of Africa's historical volcanic eruptions.

Geology

The volcano partly overlaps with two older volcanoes, Baruta and Shaheru, and is also surrounded by hundreds of small volcanic cinder cones from flank eruptions.

Nyiragongo's cone consists of pyroclastics and lava flows. Nyiragongo's lavas are low-silica, alkali-rich, ultramafic extrusive rocks essentially free of feldspars. They range from olivine-rich melilitites through leucites to nephelinites, containing, in various proportions mainly the minerals nepheline, leucite, melilite, kalsilite, and clinopyroxene. This very low silica composition results in eruptions with  unusually fluid flows.

Active history
Not much is known about how long the volcano has been erupting, but since 1882, it has erupted at least 34 times, including many periods where activity was continuous for years at a time, often in the form of a churning lava lake in the crater. The existence of the lava lake had been suspected for some time but was not scientifically confirmed until 1948. Subsequent expeditions showed that the lake fluctuated in size, depth, and temperature over time.

The lava lake activity is ongoing.

1977 eruption 
Between 1894 and 1977 the crater contained an active lava lake. On 10 January 1977, the crater walls fractured, and the lava lake drained in less than an hour.

Within 30 minutes, the lava lake had emptied, flowing north, south, and west of the volcano. Nowhere else in the world does such a steep-sided stratovolcano contain a lake of such fluid lava.  Nyiragongo's proximity to heavily populated areas increases its potential for causing a natural disaster.  The 1977 eruption raised awareness of the unique dangers posed by Nyiragongo, and because of this, in 1991 it was designated a Decade Volcano, worthy of particular study.

The 1977 eruption was preceded by the creation of a new small volcanic vent, Murara, a short distance away on the slopes of Nyamuragira.

2002 eruptions
Lava lakes reformed in the crater in eruptions in 1982–1983 and 1994. Another major eruption of the volcano began on 17 January 2002, after several months of increased seismic and fumarolic activity. A  fissure opened in the south flank of the volcano, spreading in a few hours from  elevation and reaching the outskirts of the city of Goma, the provincial capital on the northern shore of Lake Kivu. Warnings had been given and 400,000 people were evacuated from the city across the Rwandan border into neighbouring Gisenyi during the eruption. Lava covered the northern end of the runway at Goma International Airport, leaving the southern two-thirds usable, and reached Lake Kivu. This raised fears that the lava might cause gas-saturated waters deep in the lake to suddenly rise to the surface, releasing lethally large amounts of carbon dioxide and methane – similar to the disaster at Lake Nyos in Cameroon in 1986. This did not happen, but volcanologists continue to monitor the area closely.

About 245 people died in the eruption from asphyxiation by carbon dioxide and buildings collapsing due to the lava and earthquakes.

Immediately after the eruption stopped, a large number of earthquakes were felt around Goma and Gisenyi. This swarm activity continued for about three months and caused the collapse of more buildings.

Six months after the start of the 2002 eruption, Nyiragongo volcano erupted again.

Ongoing threat
Localized carbon dioxide toxicity, known locally as 'mazuku', has killed children even more recently. In locations where the gas seeps from the ground at relatively high levels, without the dispersing effects of wind, its effects can be deadly. On 8 March 2016, Goma Volcano Observatory discovered a new vent that opened in the northeast edge of the crater, following local reports of rumblings coming from the volcano.  Some fear that this could lead to a flank eruption. Observers in 2020 witnessed a rise in the lava lake and other signs of an impending eruption.

2021 eruption 

An eruption began on 22 May 2021. Lava approached the Goma airport and moved towards the city centre of eastern Goma. It was later confirmed by the North Kivu province's military governor that the eruption was at around 17:00 GMT. A highway to Beni was cut off by lava, and authorities urged residents from the city of Goma to evacuate, causing thousands of people to leave their homes. There was also an electricity cut across large areas following the eruption.  As of 27 May 2021, 37 people were missing and presumed dead, after a lava flow reached the outskirts of the city of Goma. The eruption resulted in at least 32 deaths, mostly caused by car crashes in the ensuing evacuation.

Monitoring

The volcano is monitored by a team of scientists at the Goma Volcanic Observatory (GVO). It is continuously monitored, with seismic data produced every four minutes and temperature data produced every ten minutes.  Continued funding for the GVO is in doubt, as the World Bank decided in 2020 to terminate its contributions.

See also

 Decade Volcanoes
 List of volcanic eruptions by death toll
 List of volcanoes in the Democratic Republic of the Congo

References

Notes

Bibliography

External links 

 HUGE Lava Eruption Burns Homes! Mount Nyiragongo, DR Congo - May 22, 2021
 The Big Picture: Nyiragongo Crater
 Nyiragongo volcano: jewel or threat? on France 24 TV (video missing)
 Nyiragongo volcano: jewel or threat? on France 24 TV's channel, including the video, but missing the text
 Tourism at Nyiragongo Volcano
 Photos of Nyiragongo lava lake in January 2011
 BBC News pictures of the destruction of Goma by the 2002 Eruption
 PBS Nova: "Volcano Under the City"
 Stromboli Online's expedition to Nyiragongo in May, 2005
 Alkali Basalt Association of the Continents
 Google Earth view
 Mount Nyiragongo tourism Portal

Active volcanoes
Decade Volcanoes
Volcanoes of the Great Rift Valley
Mountains of the Democratic Republic of the Congo
Virunga Mountains
Stratovolcanoes of the Democratic Republic of the Congo
21st-century volcanic events
Lake Kivu
Goma
Geological type localities
VEI-2 volcanoes
Lava lakes